Gambia Democratic Congress is a political party in the Gambia led by Mama Kandeh, a former APRC National Assembly member. It was formed in 2016 and is standing candidates in the 2017 parliamentary election. After its foundation, Kandeh toured the Gambia, attracting "huge" crowds. The initial deputy leader, Facuru Sillah, later left the party after a dispute with Kandeh.

Electoral history

Presidential elections

National Assembly elections

References

External links

Political parties established in 2016
Political parties in the Gambia
Socialism in the Gambia